The Symphony No. 9, Op. 315, is an orchestral composition by Peter Maxwell Davies, composed from December 2011 to March 2012, and dedicated to Queen Elizabeth II on the occasion of her diamond jubilee. It was premiered on 9 June 2012 by the Royal Liverpool Philharmonic, conducted by Vasily Petrenko.

History
At the time of the premiere of his Eighth, Antarctic Symphony in 2001, Davies stated it would be his last symphony. By May 2010, he had changed his mind and announced he would compose a Ninth Symphony in honour of the diamond jubilee of Queen Elizabeth II.

Character and materials
The work is scored for full orchestra with brass sextet. It is one continuous movement divided into two parts, part one consisting of a slow introduction followed by an allegro, part two which is slow throughout. Musical influences include medieval plainsong, 13th century polyphony, military marches and the string quartet Op. 54 no. 2 by Haydn. Cultural influences include the architecture of certain Christian churches and recent military interventions in Iraq and Afghanistan.

References

Sources

Further reading
 "Royal Liverpool Philharmonic Orchestra Beethoven's Ninth Saturday 9 June 2012 7:30 pm Liverpool Philharmonic Hall". Royal Liverpool Philharmonic website (Accessed 8 January 2012).
 Fisher, Neil. 2012. "RLPO/Petrenko: Concert". The Times (12 June): 12.
 Hewett, Ivan. 2012. "Peter Maxwell Davies: The Old Rebel Has a New Cause: Sir Peter Maxwell Davies Tells Ivan Hewett about the Inspiration for His Ninth Symphony". The Telegraph (7 June): 29. (Accessed 12 June 2012).

External links
, performed by the Helsinki Philharmonic Orchestra, conducted by John Storgårds (Helsinki Music Centre, 5 December 2013); 

2012 compositions
Symphonies by Peter Maxwell Davies
Davies 9
Music dedicated to nobility or royalty